Ctenotus delli, also known commonly as the Darling Range south-west ctenotus or the Darling Range southwest ctenotus,  is a species of skink, a lizard in the family Scincidae. The species is endemic to Australia.

Etymology
The specific name, delli, is in honor of Australian herpetologist John Dell.

Geographic range
C. delli is found in the Australian state of Western Australia.

Habitat
The preferred natural habitats of C. delli are forest and rocky areas.

Description
The average tail length is about one and two thirds SVL.

Reproduction
C. delli is oviparous.

Taxonomy
C. delli is a member of the C. labillardieri species group.

References

Further reading
Cogger HG (2014). Reptiles and Amphibians of Australia, Seventh Edition. Clayton, Victoria, Australia: CSIRO Publishing. xxx + 1,033 pp. .
Kay GM, Keogh JS (2012). "Molecular phylogeny and morphological revision of the Ctenotus labillardieri (Reptilia: Squamata: Scincidae) species group and a new species of immediate conservation concern in the southwestern Australian biodiversity hotspot". Zootaxa 3390: 1–18.
Storr GM (1974). "The genus Ctenotus (Lacertilia: Scincidae) in the South-west and Eucla Divisions of Western Australia". Journal of the Royal Society of Western Australia 56: 86–93. (Ctenotus delli, new species, p. 92).
Wilson S, Swan G (2013). A Complete Guide to Reptiles of Australia, Fourth Edition. Sydney: New Holland Publishers. 522 pp. .

delli
Reptiles described in 1974
Taxa named by Glen Milton Storr